The Greek Team of the Century was a representative team chosen in 2004 in the sport of Australian rules football.

Anthony Koutoufides and Peter Daicos were named vice-captains, Lou Richards was captain. The criterion for selection was that any Greek blood whatsoever constituted eligibility for the team. The farthest blood line was from Russell Morris, whose fourth great grandfather was Greek.

The Squad
Australian Football League historian, Col Hutchinson supplied the selectors with a list of 28 players with which to pick the final team.

Players named in no particular position:

 John Rombotis                                                 
 Chris Pavlou                                                  
 Charlie Pannam Snr.    
 Charlie Pannam Jnr.    
 Zeno Tzatzaris                                                
 Alby Pannam                                                   
 Alex Marcou                                                   
 Spiro Malakellis                                              
 Arthur Karanicolas                                            
 Con Gorozidis                                                 
 Gary Frangalas

See also
 Indigenous Team of the Century
 Italian Team of the Century

References

Australian Football League awards
Australian rules football awards
Australian rules football representative teams
Greek-Australian culture